James Eugene Carrey (born January 17, 1962) is a Canadian and American actor, comedian and artist. Known for his energetic slapstick performances, Carrey first gained recognition in 1990, after landing a role in the American sketch comedy television series In Living Color (1990–1994). He broke out as a star in motion pictures with Ace Ventura: Pet Detective, The Mask and Dumb and Dumber (all 1994). This was followed up with Ace Ventura: When Nature Calls, Batman Forever (both 1995) and Liar Liar (1997).

In the 2000s, he gained further notice for his portrayal of the Grinch in How the Grinch Stole Christmas and for the comedy Me, Myself & Irene (both in 2000), as well as Bruce Almighty (2003), Lemony Snicket's A Series of Unfortunate Events (2004), Fun with Dick and Jane (2005), Yes Man, Horton Hears a Who! (both 2008), and A Christmas Carol (2009). In the 2010s, Carrey appeared in the films Mr. Popper's Penguins (2011), The Incredible Burt Wonderstone, Kick-Ass 2 (both 2013), Dumb and Dumber To (2014), and portrayed Leap Day William in the sitcom 30 Rock (2012). In 2020, he portrayed Dr. Robotnik in Sonic the Hedgehog and its 2022 sequel and Joe Biden in six episodes of Saturday Night Live in the leadup to the 2020 United States presidential election.

Although largely typecast as a comedic actor, Carrey has had success in dramatic roles. His first dramatic success was for starring in the Emmy-nominated made-for-television film Doing Time on Maple Drive (1992). Carrey gained attention for his leading roles in The Truman Show (1998) and Man on the Moon (1999), earning Golden Globe Awards for each film. He later starred in the psychological science fiction romantic drama film Eternal Sunshine of the Spotless Mind (2004); this performance is repeatedly lauded as the seminal in Carrey's career and for which he was nominated for both the BAFTA Award for Best Actor in a Leading Role and another Golden Globe Award. He was also praised for his dramatic role of Jeff Piccirillo in the Showtime tragicomedy series Kidding (2018, 2020), for which he was nominated for another Golden Globe. 

In 2006, Carrey received a Grammy award nomination for Best Spoken Word Album for Children. In 2013, Carrey published his first book, a children's story titled How Roland Rolls, which was awarded a 2013 Gelett Burgess Children's Book Award. In 2020, Carrey published his first novel, Memoirs and Misinformation, which he co-authored with Dana Vachon.

Early life 
Carrey was born in the Toronto suburb of Newmarket, Ontario, Canada, to Kathleen (née Oram), a homemaker, and Percy Carrey, a musician and accountant. He was raised a Roman Catholic and has three older siblings, John, Patricia, and Rita. His mother was of French, Irish, and Scottish descent, and his father was of French-Canadian ancestry; the family's original surname was Carré. on Inside the Actors Studio.

At age eight, he began making faces before a mirror and discovered a talent for doing impressions. At age ten, Carrey wrote a letter to Carol Burnett of the Carol Burnett Show pointing out that he was already a master of impressions and should be considered for a role on the show; he was overjoyed when he received a form letter reply. A fan of Monty Python, whose TV show Monty Python's Flying Circus aired in the 1970s, in 2014 Carrey appeared on Monty Python's Best Bits (Mostly) and recalled the effect on him of Ernest Scribbler (played by Michael Palin) laughing himself to death in "The Funniest Joke in the World" sketch. Radio Times states, "You'll see why immediately: Palin's performance is uncannily Carreyesque."

Carrey spent his early years in the borough of Scarborough, Ontario, part of Metropolitan Toronto, where he attended Blessed Trinity Catholic Elementary School in North York. His family later moved to Burlington, Ontario, where they would spend eight years; Jim attended Aldershot High School while there. Some time later, his family became homeless and lived together in a Volkswagen van while teenage Jim and his brother spent months living in a tent in Charles Daley Park on the Lake Ontario shore in Lincoln, Ontario. The family struggled financially, however, their situation started improving once his father found employment in the accounting department at the Titan Wheels tire factory in Scarborough. Furthermore, in return for living in the house across the street from the factory, the family—primarily teenage sons Jim and John—would work as janitors and security guards at the tire factory, doing eight-hour shifts from 6 pm into the next morning. Moving back to Scarborough, teenage Jim started attending Agincourt Collegiate Institute before dropping out of school on his sixteenth birthday. He began to perform comedy in downtown Toronto while continuing to work at the factory.

In a 2007 Hamilton Spectator interview, Carrey said, "If my career in show business hadn't panned out I would probably be working today in Hamilton, Ontario, at the Dofasco steel mill." As a young man, he could see the steel mills across the Burlington Bay and often thought that was "where the great jobs were."

Career
1977–1983: Early impressionist work in Toronto
Carrey's first stand-up comedy experience took place in 1977 at the age of 15 with his father trying to help him put together a stage act, driving him to downtown Toronto to debut at the recently-opened Yuk Yuk's comedy club operating one-night-a-week out of community centre The 519's basement on Church Street. For the performance, Carrey had his attire—a polyester leisure suit—chosen by his mother who reasoned "that's how they dress on The Dean Martin Celebrity Roast". Pubescent Carrey's conventional impersonations bombed, proving ill-suited for a club with a raunchy comedic sensibility and giving him doubts about his potential as a professional entertainer. Decades later, recalling Carrey's stand-up debut, Yuk Yuk's owner Mark Breslin described it as "bad Rich Little". His family's financial struggles made it difficult for them to support Carrey's show business ambitions.

Eventually, the family's financial situation improved and they moved into a new home in Jackson's Point. With more domestic stability, Carrey returned to the stage in 1979 with a more polished act that led to his first paid gig: a 20-minute spot at the Hay Loft club on Highway 48 in Scarborough for a reported Can$20 compensation on a bill with the Mother of Pearl performer from The Pig and Whistle. He soon faced his fears and went back downtown to the site of his debacle from two years earlier—Yuk Yuk's that had in the meantime moved into a permanent location on Bay Street in the fashionable Yorkville district. In a short period of time, the seventeen-year-old went from open-mic nights at the club to regular paid shows, building his reputation in the process.

Parallel to his increasing local Toronto-area popularity as an impressionist stand-up comic, Carrey tried to break into sketch comedy, auditioning to be a cast member for the 1980–81 season of NBC's Saturday Night Live. Carrey ended up not being selected by the show's new executive producer Jean Doumanian who picked thirty-one-year-old Charles Rocket instead. Decades later, after establishing himself as a Hollywood film star, Carrey would host the show in May 1996, January 2011, and October 2014. After not getting Saturday Night Live, Carrey took a voice acting job performing Clutch Cargo-inspired bits on The All-Night Show, an overnight program airing locally on the CFMT-TV channel branded as Multilingual Television (MTV).

Continuing to perform his stand-up act of contortionist impressions in the city of Toronto and surrounding towns, in February 1981, nineteen-year-old Carrey was booked as the opening act for the rock band Goddo at The Roxy Theatre in Barrie for two shows on consecutive nights; the rock crowd booed him offstage and he refused to return for the second night. Two weeks later, however, a review of one of Carrey's spots at Yuk Yuk's—alongside a sizeable photo of him doing a stage impression of Sammy Davis Jr.—appeared in the Toronto Star on the front page of its entertainment section with the writer Bruce Blackadar raving about "a genuine star coming to life". Save for a brief mention in the Barrie Examiner, it was the first time Carrey received significant mainstream corporate media coverage and the glowing praise in one of Canada's highest-circulation dailies created demand for his impressionist stand-up act throughout the country. In April 1981, he appeared in an episode of the televised stand-up show An Evening at the Improv. That summer, he landed one of the main roles in Introducing... Janet, a made-for-TV movie that premiered in September 1981 on the CBC drawing more than a million viewers for its first airing in Canada. Playing a struggling impressionist comic Tony Maroni, it was Carrey's first acting role. The CBC promotion the movie had received as well its subsequent high nationwide viewership further solidified the youngster's comedic status in the country; by the time the movie finished its CBC run of repeats several years later, its title for the home video release on VHS was changed to Rubberface in order to take advantage of the comic's by then established prominence for doing elaborate contortionist impressions. Making more comedy club appearances in the United States, Carrey was noticed by comedian Rodney Dangerfield who signed Carrey to open his tour performances. By December 1981, a well-known comic in Canada, Toronto Star reported about Carrey waiting for a United States work permit having received interest from Johnny Carson's Tonight Show, largely off his reputation from Canada.

In the early part of 1982, Carrey reportedly performed for The Tonight Show bookers Jim McCauley and Bud Robinson as part of the program's audition process for stand-up comic spots. However, rather than being booked on the show, Carrey got advised to further hone his act, so he went back home to the Toronto area where he had already built a significant following. Touring venues throughout North America as the opening act for Rodney Dangerfield, Carrey made a stop at home in Toronto on 19 June 1982, performing two sold-out shows at Massey Hall.

1983–1994: Move to Hollywood
In early 1983, Carrey decided to move to Hollywood where he began regularly performing at The Comedy Store. Getting on The Tonight Show became his immediate career goal, and, by spring 1983, he appeared to have achieved it after getting booked for a stand-up set on the highly-rated late night show. However, a lukewarm club set at The Improv got him unbooked. Though struggling to replicate his success in Los Angeles, Carrey continued being a big hit in his hometown Toronto where he returned during late April 1983 to perform at the short-lived B.B. Magoon's theatrical venue on Bloor Street on three consecutive nights. While in town, CTV's flagship newsmagazine program W5 did a feature on Carrey that aired nationally in Canada. Back in L.A., within months, he landed the main role on The Duck Factory, a sitcom being developed for NBC, and, in late November 1983, still got to debut his impressionist act on The Tonight Show Starring Johnny Carson via a promotional appearance for the sitcom about to start airing nationally in the United States on the same network. In the meantime, he was cast for a supporting role in the Warner Bros. comedy production Finders Keepers, shot in the Canadian province of Alberta during late summer 1983. For his Tonight Show appearance that aired on American Thanksgiving, 21-year-old Carrey went through his most popular impressions—Elvis Presley, Leonid Brezhnev, Jack Nicholson, Bruce Dern, Clint Eastwood, Charles Bronson, Michael Landon, James Dean, E.T. the Extra-Terrestrial, Charles Nelson Reilly, characters from My Three Sons, and Kermit the Frog and Miss Piggy—in rapid succession. After completing his set, though getting the OK gesture from Carson, the impressionist comic was notably not waved over by the host to join him on the couch—a usual indication that while sufficiently pleased, the powerful host was probably not ecstatic about the performance. The end of 1983 saw Carrey go back home to Toronto once more for a publicized New Years' Eve performance at the Royal York Hotel's Imperial Room.

Originally scheduled to start airing in January 1984, The Duck Factory sitcom debut in April, airing Thursdays at 9:30pm between Cheers and Hill Street Blues. The same month, Carrey took a job hosting the 1984 U-Know Awards ceremony held in Toronto at the Royal York Hotel's Ballroom. By the time he made his debut appearance on NBC's Late Night with David Letterman in late July 1984, the network had already cancelled The Duck Factory; Carrey went back to touring with his impressionist act, including often opening for Rodney Dangerfield.

After being noticed doing stand-up by producer Samuel Goldwyn Jr. and contacted to audition for a teen horror sex comedy being developed by The Samuel Goldwyn Company, Carrey landed a starring role in Once Bitten shot in early 1985. Carrey would continue getting film roles; throughout late summer and early fall 1985, he shot a supporting part in Francis Ford Coppola's Peggy Sue Got Married which went into a long post-production process. In parallel, he decided to try out for Saturday Night Live again, this time ahead of the show's 1985-86 season being prepared by returning executive producer Lorne Michaels who was looking to hire an all-new cast. Five years removed from his previous SNL audition, twenty-three-year-old Carrey was rejected again, reportedly never even getting the chance to audition his material—'post-nuclear Elvis' hybrid impression and impersonation of Henry Fonda from On Golden Pond—in front of executive producer Michaels due to the show's producers and senior writers Al Franken, Tom Davis, and Jim Downey deciding that Michaels would not like it. Unlike his previous SNL rejection, Carrey now had a bit of a film career to fall back on in addition to his impressionist stand-up act; Once Bitten was released in mid November 1985 and turned out to be a modest box-office hit despite drawing poor reviews.

Back on the comedy club circuit with impressions, in fall 1986, Carrey auditioned for SNLs upcoming season, his third attempt at getting on the ensemble sketch comedy show. Finally managing to perform for the show's executive producer Lorne Michaels at a Burbank studio, with returning cast members Dennis Miller, Jon Lovitz, and Nora Dunn also watching the audition, Carrey was rejected again. Among the group of hopefuls auditioning alongside Carrey on this occasion were Dana Carvey and Phil Hartman, both of whom were hired.

Sensing that doing only impressions was turning into a career dead-end, Carrey set out to develop a new live comedy act. Much to the dismay of comedy club owners booking him, he began abandoning trademark celebrity impressions, opting instead to try adding observational and character humour to his comedic repertoire, a process that often involved forcing himself to improvise and scramble in front of dissatisfied live audiences that came to see him do impressions.

From 1990 to 1994, Carrey was a regular cast member of the ensemble comedy television series In Living Color. While short-lived, the popularity of this series helped him to land his first few major film roles.

1994–1998: Rise to fame
Carrey played the lead role in Ace Ventura: Pet Detective which was released in February 1994 and went on to gross $72 million in the United States and Canada. Following its success and before the release of his next film, The Mask, which was anticipated to be another hit, Morgan Creek Productions paid him $5 million to reprise his role as Ace Ventura and New Line Cinema offered him $7 million to make a sequel to The Mask and paid him $7 million to appear in Dumb and Dumber, a nearly tenfold increase on his salary for Ace Ventura. The Mask, released in July 1994, grossed $351 million worldwide, and Dumb and Dumber, released in December 1994, was another commercial success, grossing over $270 million worldwide. Carrey received his first Golden Globe Award nomination for Best Actor for his work in The Mask and was voted second on Quigley's Top Ten Money Making Stars Poll, behind Tom Hanks.

Carrey portrayed the Batman villain the Riddler in the Joel Schumacher-directed superhero film Batman Forever (1995). The film received mixed reviews, but was a box office success. He reprised his role as Ace Ventura in Ace Ventura: When Nature Calls which was also released in 1995. Like the original film, it was well received by the public, but poorly received by critics. It was a huge box-office success, earning $212 million worldwide in addition to breaking records, with a $40 million opening weekend.

Carrey became the first actor to be paid $20 million for his next film, The Cable Guy (1996). Directed by Ben Stiller, the film was a satirical black comedy, in which Carrey played a lonely, menacing cable TV installer who infiltrates the life of one of his customers (played by Matthew Broderick). The role was a departure from the "hapless, hyper, overconfident" characters he had been known for. However, it did not fare well with most critics, many reacting to Carrey's change of tone from previous films. Carrey also starred in the music video of the film's closing song, "Leave Me Alone" by Jerry Cantrell. Despite the reviews, The Cable Guy grossed $102 million worldwide.

He soon bounced back with the critically acclaimed comedy Liar Liar (1997), playing Fletcher Reede, an unethical lawyer rendered unable to lie by his young son's birthday wish. Carrey was praised for his performance, earning a second Golden Globe Award nomination for Best Actor. Janet Maslin of The New York Times said: "Well into his tumultuous career, Mr. Carrey finally turns up in a straightforward comic vehicle, and the results are much wilder and funnier than this mundane material should have allowed."

1998–2007: Critical acclaim
The following year he decided to take a pay cut to play the seriocomic role of Truman Burbank in the satirical comedy-drama film The Truman Show (1998). The film was highly praised and brought Carrey further international acclaim, leading many to believe he would be nominated for an Academy Award. For The Truman Show, he was nominated Golden Globe Award for Best Actor in a Motion Picture Drama. The Truman Show was a commercial success, earning $264 million worldwide against a budget of $60 million. A Film4 critic stated that the film "allows Carrey to edge away from broad comedy," adding that it was "a hilarious and breathtakingly conceived satire."

That same year, Carrey appeared as a fictionalized version of himself on the final episode of Garry Shandling's The Larry Sanders Show, in which he deliberately ripped into Shandling's character. In 1999, Carrey had the lead role in Man on the Moon. He portrayed comedian Andy Kaufman to critical acclaim and received his second Golden Globe in a row. In addition, he received his first Screen Actors Guild Award nomination for Best Actor.

In 2000, Carrey reteamed with the Farrelly brothers, who had previously directed him in Dumb and Dumber, for the black comedy film Me, Myself & Irene, a film that received mixed reviews but enjoyed box office success. Carrey played the role of state trooper Charlie Baileygates, who has multiple personalities and romances a woman portrayed by Renée Zellweger. That same year, Carrey starred in the second highest-grossing Christmas film of all time, How the Grinch Stole Christmas, playing the title character, for which he received both praise and criticism from critics alongside a Golden Globe nomination.

For his next feature film, Carrey starred opposite Jennifer Aniston and Morgan Freeman in Tom Shadyac's international hit comedy Bruce Almighty (2003). Carrey played a television newsman who unexpectedly receives God's omnipotent abilities when the deity decides to take a vacation. The film received mixed reviews upon release but still became a financial success, earning over $484 million worldwide, and going on to become the seventeenth highest-grossing live action comedy of all time.

In 2004, Carrey starred in Eternal Sunshine of the Spotless Mind. The film received critical acclaim upon release. Critics highly praised Carrey's portrayal of Joel Barish, in addition to the performance of his co-star Kate Winslet, who was nominated for an Oscar. According to CNN's reviewer Paul Clinton, Carrey's performance was the actor's "best, most mature and sharply focused performance ever." Carrey received another Golden Globe nomination and his first BAFTA Award nomination for Best Actor.

Carrey's next appearance was in the 2004 black comedy fantasy film Lemony Snicket's A Series of Unfortunate Events, which was based on the children's novels of the same name. The film was positively received; Desson Thomson from The Washington Post said of Carrey's approach to the character of Count Olaf,

Olaf is a humorless villain in the book. He's not amusing like Carrey at all. To which I would counter: If you can't let Carrey be Carrey, put someone boring and less expensive in the role. In his various disguises he's rubbery, inventive and improvisationally inspired. I particularly liked his passing imitation of a dinosaur.

That same year, Carrey was inducted into the Canadian Walk of Fame. In 2005, Carrey starred in the remake of Fun with Dick and Jane with Tea Leoni, which grossed $200 million with a profit of $100 million.

2007–2018: Change in pace
Carrey reunited with Joel Schumacher, director of Batman Forever, for The Number 23 (2007), a psychological thriller co-starring Virginia Madsen and Danny Huston. In the film, Carrey plays a man who becomes obsessed with the number 23, after finding a book about a man with the same obsession. The film was panned by critics. The following year Carrey provided his voice for Dr. Seuss' Horton Hears a Who! (2008). Carrey voiced Horton the Elephant for the CGI-animated feature, which was a box office success, grossing over $290 million worldwide.

Carrey returned to live-action comedy, starring opposite Zooey Deschanel and Bradley Cooper in Yes Man (also 2008). Carrey played a man who signs up for a self-help program that teaches him to say yes to everything. Despite reviews being mixed, Rene Rodriquez of The Miami Herald stated, "Yes Man is fine as far as Jim Carrey comedies go, but it's even better as a love story that just happens to make you laugh." The film had a decent performance at the box office, earning $225 million worldwide.

Since 2009, Carrey's work has included a leading role in Glenn Ficarra and John Requa's I Love You Phillip Morris, premiering in January 2009 at the Sundance Film Festival before receiving a wide release in February 2010. Carrey portrayed Steven Jay Russell, a con artist, imposter, and multiple prison escapee who falls in love with his fellow inmate, Phillip Morris (played by Ewan McGregor). The film received largely positive reviews, with Damon Wise of The Times giving the film four stars out of five, stating, "I Love You Phillip Morris is an extraordinary film that serves as a reminder of just how good Carrey can be when he's not tied into a generic Hollywood crowd-pleaser. His comic timing remains as exquisite as ever."

For the first time in his career, Carrey portrayed multiple characters in Disney's 3D animated take on the classic Charles Dickens tale, A Christmas Carol (2009), voicing Ebenezer Scrooge and the Ghosts of Christmas Past, Present, and Future. Directed by Robert Zemeckis, the film also starred Robin Wright Penn, Bob Hoskins, Colin Firth, Gary Oldman, and Cary Elwes. The film received decent reviews and was a financial success. Carrey landed the lead role in Mr. Popper's Penguins (2011), playing Tom Popper Jr., a realtor who becomes the caretaker of a family of penguins. The film received a mixed reception upon release.

He starred alongside former co-star Steve Carell in the Don Scardino-directed comedy film The Incredible Burt Wonderstone (2013). Carrey played Steve Gray, a dangerous street magician who overshadows the formerly successful magician Burt Wonderstone (played by Carell). The film was released in March 2013 to mixed reviews and underperformed significantly at the box office, grossing just over $27 million on a $30 million budget.

Around the same time, he appeared in Kick-Ass 2 (also 2013) as Colonel Stars and Stripes. He retracted support for the film two months prior to its release. He issued a statement via his Twitter account that, in light of the Sandy Hook Elementary School shooting, "Now in all good conscience I cannot support that level of violence."

Peter Farrelly said in April 2012 that Carrey and Jeff Daniels would return for a Dumb and Dumber sequel, Dumb and Dumber To, with the Farrelly brothers writing and directing and a planned September 2012 production start. In June, however, Carrey's representative said Carrey had left the project because the comedian felt New Line and Warner Bros. were unenthusiastic toward it. However, on 1 October 2012, Yahoo!'s The Yo Show carried the news item that the script was complete and that the original actors, Carrey and Daniels, would be reprising their roles. The plot involved one of the characters having sired a child and needing to find them to obtain a kidney. Dumb and Dumber To was released in November 2014.

In March 2013, Carrey announced that he had written a children's book titled How Roland Rolls, about a scared wave named Roland. He described it as "kind of a metaphysical children's story, which deals with a lot of heavy stuff in a really childish way." Carrey self-published the book, which was released in September 2013.

On March 25, 2013, Carrey released a parody music video with Eels through Funny or Die, with Carrey replacing Mark Oliver Everett on vocals. The song and video, titled "Cold Dead Hand" and set as a musical act during the variety program Hee Haw, lampoons American gun culture, and specifically former NRA spokesperson Charlton Heston.

Carrey delivered the commencement address at Maharishi University of Management in Fairfield, Iowa, in May 2014 and received an honorary doctorate for his achievements as a comedian, artist, author, and philanthropist.

Carrey was a producer on Rubble Kings, a 2015 documentary film that depicts events preceding and following the Hoe Avenue peace meeting.

On 29 August 2014, Carrey was honoured by Canada Post with a limited-edition postage stamp with his portrait on it.

In June 2017, Showtime began airing the dramedy I'm Dying Up Here, for which Carrey served as the executive producer. The show, which chronicles a group of stand-up comics in 1970s Los Angeles, incorporates aspects of Carrey's own experience. In September of that year, that same network announced that he would be starring in a comedy series titled Kidding, which will reunite Carrey and director Michel Gondry. By the end of 2017, it was announced that Catherine Keener would star opposite Carrey in Kidding.

Carrey was also the subject of two documentaries in 2017. The first, a short subject entitled I Needed Color about his lifelong passion for art, was released online in the summer. Later that year another documentary, Jim & Andy: The Great Beyond—Featuring a Very Special, Contractually Obligated Mention of Tony Clifton, premiered at The Venice Film Festival and was later picked up by Netflix. The film chronicles the behind-the-scenes drama during the shooting of Man on the Moon, when he never broke character as Andy Kaufman. It incorporates footage that was shot for the film's electronic press kit but ultimately pulled by Universal as they felt that it was too damaging.

2018–present: Comeback

In June 2018, Carrey was cast as Dr. Robotnik, the main antagonist of the Sonic the Hedgehog video game series, in a film adaptation of the franchise. The film was released in February 2020 to positive reviews. Carrey's portrayal of Robotnik was praised, with some considering it one of his best performances in years. Carrey returned for Sonic the Hedgehog 2, released in April 2022, which grossed $72 million at the US box office in its opening weekend to give Carrey the best opening of his career to date.

In 2020, Carrey published Memoirs and Misinformation. In September, during the final stages of the 2020 U.S. presidential election, it was announced that Carrey would portray presidential nominee Joe Biden on the 46th season of Saturday Night Live, taking over the role from Jason Sudeikis, Woody Harrelson and John Mulaney. However, Carrey's high-energy comedy style clashed with real-life Biden's low-key persona, producing an imitation that lacked authenticity, and failed to impress viewers and critics. On December 19, 2020, Carrey announced that he would step down from playing Biden on Saturday Night Live, stating that he had a six-week deal. Cast member Alex Moffat succeeded Carrey in portraying Biden during the cold open of the episode hosted by Kristen Wiig at the same day.

Carrey appeared as the narrator of The Weeknd album Dawn FM, released on 7 January 2022.

In April 2022, Carrey announced that he was considering retirement from the film industry, explaining, "I have enough. I've done enough. I am enough." When asked if he would ever come back, his response was, "It depends. If the angels bring some sort of script that's written in gold ink that says to me that it's going to be really important for people to see, I might continue down the road, but I'm taking a break".

Personal life
Carrey suffers from depression and has taken Prozac to combat the symptoms. He has stated that he no longer takes medications or stimulants of any kind, including coffee. 

He received U.S. citizenship in October 2004 and remains a dual citizen of the United States and his native Canada.

In November 2022, the Russian Ministry of Foreign Affairs banned 100 Canadians including Jim Carrey from entering Russia as a reciprocity for the Western sanctions that had been introduced due to Russia's invasion of Ukraine.

 Relationships 
 In 1983, Jim Carrey dated singer Linda Ronstadt for eight months. Carrey has been married twice. His first marriage was to former actress and Comedy Store waitress Melissa Womer, whom he married on 28 March 1987. Their daughter, Jane Erin Carrey, was born 6 September 1987. Jane was a 2012 contestant on American Idol. Carrey and Womer divorced in 1995.

On 23 September 1996, Carrey married his Dumb and Dumber co-star Lauren Holly; the marriage lasted less than a year. From 1999 to 2000, Carrey was engaged to his Me, Myself and Irene co-star Renée Zellweger. January Jones was in a relationship with Carrey in 2002. Carrey met model and actress Jenny McCarthy in 2005 and made their relationship public in June 2006. In April 2010, the two ended their relationship. In October 2010, McCarthy said they remained good friends.

Carrey met Cathriona White in 2012, a makeup artist from County Tipperary, Ireland. They dated between 2012 and 2015. On 28 September 2015, White was found dead from a prescription drug overdose; the death was ruled a suicide by the Los Angeles County Medical Examiner. Carrey was a pallbearer at her funeral in Cappawhite, County Tipperary, Ireland.

Carrey attended the Golden Globes 2019 Party with his girlfriend Ginger Gonzaga in January 2019. The couple split after less than a year of dating.

 Wrongful death lawsuits 
Carrey's girlfriend Cathriona White married Mark Burton in 2013, in Las Vegas. She had been dating Carrey on and off since 2012, and was still married but dating Carrey when she died in 2015. On 19 September 2016, Burton filed a wrongful death lawsuit against Carrey, claiming that he had used his "immense wealth and celebrity status" to illegally obtain and distribute prescription drugs involved in White's death. Carrey released a statement the following day:

In October 2016, White's mother, Brigid Sweetman, also filed a wrongful death lawsuit against Carrey. In this suit, Sweetman's attorney states that Carrey underwent a test for sexually transmitted infections, tested positive for hepatitis A, HSV (Herpes) I and II, and chlamydia, and hid the results from White and had unprotected sex with her. Sweetman later issued a statement: "These documents show that Jim Carrey has lied to the media, the public and the court. Carrey has now been shown for what he is—a dishonest Hollywood celebrity who thinks he can say anything and fool people just because he is famous."

Both lawsuits were dismissed on January 25, 2018, and attorneys for both sides confirmed there would be no further legal proceedings.

 Vaccine skepticism 
In 2009, Carrey wrote an article questioning the merits of vaccination for The Huffington Post. With former partner Jenny McCarthy, Carrey led a "Green Our Vaccines" march in Washington, D.C., to advocate for the removal of "toxic substances" from children's vaccines, out of a belief that children had received "too many vaccines, too soon, many of which are toxic". The rally was criticized by David Gorski, an American surgical oncologist on Science-Based Medicine blog, for being anti-vaccine and not "pro-safe vaccine", and by Steven Parker on the WebMD website for being "irresponsible".

On July 1, 2015, after the signing of a new vaccination law, Carrey called California Governor Jerry Brown a "corporate fascist" who was "poisoning" children by enacting the vaccination requirements. The law disallowed religious and philosophical reasons for exemption from vaccination. Carrey was criticized for being "ignorant when it comes to vaccines" by Arthur Caplan, head of the Division of Medical Ethics, at New York University, and by Jeffrey Kluger, senior writer at Time, who described his anti-vaccination statements as "angry, dense and immune to reason".

 Political and spiritual views 
Carrey is an outspoken advocate of the "law of attraction". In an interview with Oprah Winfrey on 17 February 1997, he revealed that as a struggling actor he would use visualization techniques to get work. He also stated that he visualized a $10 million check given to him for "acting services rendered", placed the check in his pocket, and seven years later received a $10 million check for his role in Dumb and Dumber.Carrey practices Transcendental Meditation.

Carrey has defended socialism and has urged the Democratic Party to embrace the movement, saying "We have to say yes to socialism, to the word and everything. We have to stop apologizing".

Carrey has shared his own political cartoon drawings since August 2017, including controversial renderings of then-White House Press Secretary Sarah Huckabee Sanders and then-President Donald Trump. He sparked an international event on 31 March 2019, posting a drawing criticising fascism by depicting Benito Mussolini's infamous death with Clara Petacci; this irked Mussolini's granddaughter Alessandra who chided him on Twitter calling him "a bastard" and his artworks "dirty paper." His drawing repertoire culminated in an exhibition titled IndigNation, which opened on 23 October 2018 at the Maccarone Gallery in Los Angeles and featured 108 pen-and-ink drawings from Carrey's Twitter feed from 2016 to 2018.

 Artwork and NFTs 
In 2017, Carrey revealed that he had been painting for the past six years. In 2011, he exhibited the painting Nothing to See Here in an art show in Palm Springs at the Heather James Fine Art Gallery. In 2017, Carrey released a six-minute documentary entitled, I Needed Color, which showed him working in his studio. In April 2022, Carrey announced that he had minted his first art NFT via the NFT platform SuperRare. The NFT is based on a painting entitled Sunflower, and is accompanied by original voiceover.

 Awards and nominations 

 Selected filmography 

 Discography 
 Singles 
 "Cuban Pete" (1995) – AUS , UK 
 "Somebody to Love" (1996) – AUS 
 "Cold Dead Hand" (2013) (as Lonesome Earl and the Clutterbusters'')

Other 
 George Martin  "I Am the Walrus" (1998)
 The Weeknd  "Dawn FM", "Out of Time" and "Phantom Regret by Jim" (2022)

Written works

Books

Forewords

See also

References

Further reading

External links 

 
 
 
 Article at thecanadianencyclopedia.ca

1962 births
Living people
20th-century Canadian comedians
20th-century Canadian male actors
20th-century Canadian male writers
21st-century American comedians
21st-century American male actors
21st-century American male writers
21st-century American novelists
21st-century American screenwriters
21st-century Canadian comedians
21st-century Canadian male actors
21st-century Canadian male writers
21st-century Canadian novelists
21st-century Canadian screenwriters
American anti-vaccination activists
American cartoonists
American film producers
American impressionists (entertainers)
American male comedians
American male comedy actors
American male film actors
American male screenwriters
American male television actors
American male television writers
American male voice actors
American people of French descent
American people of French-Canadian descent
American people of Irish descent
American people of Scottish descent
American sketch comedians
American stand-up comedians
American television writers
Best Drama Actor Golden Globe (film) winners
Best Musical or Comedy Actor Golden Globe (film) winners
Canadian cartoonists
Canadian emigrants to the United States
Canadian expatriate male actors in the United States
Film producers from Ontario
Canadian impressionists (entertainers)
Canadian male comedians
Canadian male film actors
Canadian male screenwriters
Canadian male television actors
Canadian male television writers
Canadian male voice actors
Canadian people of French descent
Canadian people of Irish descent
Canadian people of Scottish descent
Canadian sketch comedians
Canadian stand-up comedians
Canadian television writers
Canadian anti-vaccination activists
Comedians from Toronto
Male actors from Toronto
Method actors
Naturalized citizens of the United States
People from Burlington, Ontario
People from Newmarket, Ontario
Writers from Scarborough, Toronto